The Confederate Monument of Bardstown, in Bardstown, Kentucky was erected in 1903 in the Bardstown St. Joseph's Cemetery to honor the sacrifice of 67 Confederate States Army soldiers, who died during the American Civil War. Some 17 of the soldiers are still unknown.

History 
Most of the soldiers were under the command of Major General Braxton Bragg who died in 1862 in conflicts around Bardstown.  

The monument was dedicated by the J. Crepps Wickliffe Chapter of the United Daughters of the Confederacy. The base is made of limestone, and the statue of the Confederate soldier was made of zinc. A relief portrait of General Robert E. Lee is located directly beneath the statue. 

The inscription reads:
 Lord God of hosts, Be with us yet;
 Lest we forget, Lest we forget.
 Marble tells not of their valor's worth,
 Nameless, they rest in quiet earth.

 We care not whence they came,
 Dear is their lifeless clay;
 Whether unknown, or known to fame,
 their cause and country still the same,
 they died and wore the gray.''

It was placed on the National Register of Historic Places on July 17, 1997, one of sixty monuments to the American Civil War in Kentucky so honored on the same day. Starting in early autumn of 1999 the Sons of Confederate Veterans endeavored to restore and erect the individual gravemarkers.

See also
Louisville in the American Civil War
Kentucky in the American Civil War

References

External links
SCV article on the Monument  Includes list of known Confederate soldiers interred there.
List of the dead

Civil War Monuments of Kentucky MPS
National Register of Historic Places in Bardstown, Kentucky
Confederate States of America monuments and memorials in Kentucky
Zinc sculptures in the United States
1903 sculptures
1903 establishments in Kentucky
Monuments and memorials to Robert E. Lee